Crow Lake is a lake in Cook County, Minnesota.  Crow Lake lies at an elevation of 1850 feet (564 m).

References

Lakes of Minnesota
Lakes of Cook County, Minnesota